Edeowie may refer to:

Edeowie, South Australia, a ghost town
Edeowie glass, a natural glass found in South Australia
Edeowie  Station, a pastoral lease in South Australia
Hundred of Edeowie, a cadastral unit in South Australia